Jackson County is a county located in the U.S. state of Florida, on its northwestern border with Alabama. As of the 2020 census, the population was 47,319. Its county seat is Marianna.

History
Jackson County was created by the Florida Territorial Council in 1822 out of Escambia County, at the same time that Duval County was organized from land of St. Johns County, making them the third and fourth counties in the Territory. The county was named for Andrew Jackson, a General of the War of 1812, who had served as Florida's first military governor for six months in 1821. Jackson County originally extended from the Choctawhatchee River on the west to the Suwannee River on the east. By 1840 the county had been reduced close to its present boundaries through the creation of new counties from its original territory, following an increase of population in these areas. Minor adjustments to the county boundaries continued through most of the 19th century, however.

There were no towns in Jackson County when it was formed. The first county court met at what was called "Robinson's Big Spring" (later called Blue Springs) in 1822 and then at the "Big Spring of the Choctawhatchee" in 1823. The following year the county court met at "Chipola Settlement", which is also known as Waddell's Mill Pond.

European Americans developed this area of Florida as part of the plantation belt in the antebellum years. Cotton was cultivated as a commodity crop by large workgangs of enslaved African Americans, and Florida became a slave society.

Gradually towns were developed. In January 1821, Webbville had been established as the first town in Jackson County. It was the first designated as the county seat. Marianna was founded in September 1821 by Robert Beveridge, a native of Scotland. About 1828, Beveridge and other Marianna settlers went to Tallahassee to lobby the state legislature to move the county seat to Marianna.

They enticed the Florida Legislature with offers of free land, locally paying for construction of a county courthouse and development of a related public square, and donating an additional $500 to purchase a quarter section of land to be sold at public auction as a way to finance the new government, if the county seat was moved to Marianna. Beveridge and his supporters succeeded in their civic bribe. Marianna became the de facto county seat of the county justice and civil authority, although it was never officially proclaimed as such. Marianna began to grow and prosper when the county government moved into the new courthouse in 1829. It became the market and court town for the rural county.

Webbville's prominent citizens moved to Marianna to follow the courts, as did numerous businesses. When the L&N Railroad decided to bypass putting a station at Webbville, the town declined further and became defunct.

Jackson County war
After the Civil War, the county was convulsed by violence as Confederate veterans and their allies attacked and intimidated freedmen and their sympathizers. The county faced the worst economic conditions in the state, as it had been most extensively developed for cotton plantations before the war, and was adversely affected by the international decline in the market. White planters resisted dealing with freedmen as free workers. Insurgent Confederate veterans formed a Ku Klux Klan chapter and carried out masked violence to exert power, intimidate freedmen and white sympathizers, suppress their voting, and restore white supremacy.

Planters were defaulting on tax payments due to the poor economic conditions, and Republican county officials began to sell thousands of acres in tax sales. In addition the two representatives of the Freedmen's Bureau, Charles Memorial Hamilton and William J. Purman, worked to break the cycle of black labor exploitation. Planters would throw sharecroppers off the land at the end of the season with no payment, claiming infractions that the Bureau deemed minor. The Bureau agents worked to enforce labor contracts.

Tensions broke out into violence and in 1869 Jackson County became the center of a guerrilla war extending through 1871; it became known as the Jackson County War. The local Ku Klux Klan, insurgent Confederate Army veterans, directed their violence at eradicating the Republican Party in the county, assassinating more than 150 Republican Party leaders and other prominent African Americans as part of a successful campaign to retain white Democratic power in the county. Another source says that in Jackson County, 200 "leading Republicans" were assassinated in 1869 and 1870 alone; no one was arrested or brought to trial for these crimes.

 In 1871 he resigned, saying given the "lawlessness", he could not carry out the duties of sheriff. The last Republican official in the county, clerk of the circuit court John Dickenson, was assassinated in 1871. (The previous clerk, Dr. John Finlayson, was killed in 1869.)

In testimony to Congressional hearings about the KKK, state senator Charles H. Pearce, minister of the African Methodist Episcopal Church, said, "Satan has his seat; he reigns in Jackson County."

Post-Reconstruction era to present
Violence by whites against blacks in the county continued after Reconstruction. Nine African Americans were lynched here after Reconstruction, most around the turn of the century. But notorious lynchings of individual men also took place later.

In 1934, Claude Neal, an African-American suspect in the murder of a young white woman, was tortured, shot and hanged in a spectacle lynching that was announced beforehand on the radio and in a local paper. It was covered by national newspapers, arousing condemnation. In addition, Neal's lynching was followed by a white riot in Marianna, in which whites attacked the black section of town and blacks on the street, injuring 200, including two police officers, and causing much property damage. Howard Kester, a prominent Southern evangelical minister who tried to improve conditions, assessed the economic and class issues related to the racial violence. In 1943 the last lynching in the county was conducted. Cellos Harrison, an African-American man, had been twice convicted by an all-white jury and sentenced to death. He was taken from the county jail in Marianna by a white mob and hanged while his case was being appealed.

Geography
Jackson County is the only county in Florida that borders both Georgia and Alabama. Jackson County is in the Central Standard Time Zone. Its eastern border with Gadsden County forms the boundary in this area between the Central Standard and Eastern Standard Time Zones.

Adjacent counties

 Seminole County, Georgia - east (EST)
 Gadsden County, Florida - southeast (EST)
 Liberty County, Florida - southeast (EST)
 Calhoun County, Florida - south
 Washington County, Florida - southwest
 Bay County, Florida - southwest
 Holmes County, Florida - west
 Geneva County, Alabama - northwest
 Houston County, Alabama - north

Rivers and water bodies
Three water bodies form the eastern border of Jackson county. The Chattahoochee River forms the northeast boundary between Jackson County and Seminole County, Georgia. It flows into Lake Seminole. The Lake was formed by the Jim Woodruff Dam which was completed in 1952. The outflow at the dam becomes the Apalachicola River which is the eastern boundary of Jackson county with Gadsden county.

The Chipola River is formed in north central Jackson county from the confluences of Black Creek and Cowarts Creek. It continues south through the county and becomes a part of the border between Jackson county and the west side of the northern section of Calhoun county.

Holmes Creek forms the northern portion of the western border of Jackson county with Holmes County.

Blue Springs is a Jackson county recreation area east of Marianna located near the site of former Florida Governor John Milton's Sylvania plantation.

Two other notable water bodies in the county are Compass Lake in the southwest and Ocheesee Pond in the southeast.

Florida State Parks in Jackson county
Florida Caverns State Park is on the Chipola river. At Blue Hole Springs the river disappears underground for a few thousand feet and then resurfaces.
Three Rivers State Park is located north of Sneads. It is at the junction of the Chattahoochee and the Flint (which flow into Lake Seminole from Georgia), and the Apalachicola which begins at the Lake Seminole Dam.

Demographics

2020 census

As of the 2020 United States census, there were 47,319 people, 17,149 households, and 11,152 families residing in the county.

2000 census
As of the census of 2000, there were 46,755 people, 16,620 households, and 11,600 families residing in the county.  The population density was 51 people per square mile (20/km2).  There were 19,490 housing units at an average density of 21 per square mile (8/km2).  The racial makeup of the county was 72.18% White, 24.56% Black or African American, 0.77% Native American, 0.46% Asian, 0.03% Pacific Islander, 0.61% from other races, and 1.40% from two or more races.  2.91% of the population were Hispanic or Latino of any race.

There were 16,620 households, out of which 30.90% had children under the age of 18 living with them, 51.50% were married couples living together, 14.40% had a female householder with no husband present, and 30.20% were non-families. 27.00% of all households were made up of individuals, and 12.80% had someone living alone who was 65 years of age or older.  The average household size was 2.44 and the average family size was 2.95.

In the county, the population was spread out, with 22.30% under the age of 18, 9.70% from 18 to 24, 29.60% from 25 to 44, 23.80% from 45 to 64, and 14.60% who were 65 years of age or older.  The median age was 38 years. For every 100 females there were 110.40 males.  For every 100 females age 18 and over, there were 111.20 males.

The median income for a household in the county was $29,744, and the median income for a family was $36,404. Males had a median income of $27,138 versus $21,180 for females. The per capita income for the county was $13,905.  About 12.80% of families and 17.20% of the population were below the poverty line, including 23.70% of those under age 18 and 21.00% of those age 65 or over.

Politics

Jackson County is governed by a five-member board of county commissioners.

Politically, the county is predominantly Republican. The last time a Democrat won the county in the presidential election was 1980, when Jimmy Carter, the former governor of neighboring Georgia, was on the ballot. The county is part of Florida's 2nd congressional district, represented by Neal Dunn (R-Panama City).

At the state level, Jackson County is part of Florida State Senate district 2. This district is represented by Jay Trumbull (R-Panama City). In the State House of Representatives, the county forms part of House district 5. This district is represented by Shane Abbott (R-DeFuniak Springs).

Education
The Jackson County School Board, the sole school district of the county, operates public schools.

Jackson County is also home to Baptist College of Florida, an institution of higher education in Graceville affiliated with the Florida Baptist Convention, and Chipola College, a state college in Marianna.

Libraries
The Jackson County Public Library System has three branches. Jackson County is also a part of the Panhandle Public Library Cooperative System. The PPLCS also includes Holmes, and Calhoun counties.
 Marianna
 Graceville
 Greenwood

Government and infrastructure
The Florida Department of Corrections operates Region I - Correctional Facility Office in an unincorporated area in Jackson County.

The Florida Department of Juvenile Justice Dozier School for Boys, closed in 2011 after extensive investigations of abuse, was located in Marianna.

In 2018, the department fired deputy Zachary Wester, who was arrested for planting drugs in the vehicles of innocent motorists. The sheriff's department has dropped charges in 119 cases.

Jackson County Fire Rescue provides EMS and Fire Services with over 30 to 35 personnel.

Transportation

Airports
Jackson County's main airport is Marianna Municipal Airport, originally known as the Graham Air Base. Local and private airports also exist throughout the county.

Major highways

  Interstate 10 is the main west-to-east interstate highway in the county, and runs along southern Jackson County for a length of 33 miles. It contains five interchanges within the county; US 231 (Exit 130), SR 276 (Exit 136), SR 71 (Exit 142), SR 69 (Exit 152), and CR 268 (Exit 158).
  US 90 was the main west-to-east highway in the county, until it was surpassed by I-10.
  US 231 is the sole south-to-north U.S. highway running through the western part of the county.
  State Road 2 is the west to east route that's closest to the Alabama border.
  State Road 69 is a south-to-north state highway that enters from Calhoun County north of Ocheesee. North of the interchange with I-10, it passes through Grand Ridge, Dellwood, Two Egg, and finally terminates at SR 71 in Greenwood, across from the eastern terminus of Jackson County Road 162.
  State Road 71 is a south-to-north highway that enters the county from Altha in Calhoun County. North of the interchange with I-10, it has a westbound overlap with US 90 for approximately 1.7 miles, then branches off in a northeasterly direction. Curving north, it passes the Marianne Municipal Airport, then runs through Malone, only to curve to the northwest on its way to the Alabama State Line where it becomes AL 53.
  State Road 73 is a south-to-north highway that enters the county from Willis in Calhoun County. In Marianna, Florida it has a westbound overlap with US 90 which begins at the southern terminus of SR 166. then branches off in a northwesterly direction for 9 miles until finally terminating at US 231.
  State Road 77 is a south-to-north highway running through northwestern Jackson County from Chipley, Florida in Washington County. The road has an overlap with SR 2 in Graceville and terminates at the Alabama State Line where it becomes AL 109.
  State Road 166 is a short south to north state highway running through Marianna and a portion of rural Jackson County northeast of the city limits.
  State Road 273 is a south to north state highway running through northwestern Jackson County.
  State Road 276 exists primarily in Marianna, but has county extensions in both Washington and Jackson Counties.

Railroads
Jackson County has two railroad lines. The primary one is the CSX P&A Subdivision, a line formerly owned by the Louisville and Nashville Railroad that served Amtrak's Sunset Limited. This service formerly went to New Orleans, but in 2005 service was truncated by the extensive damage in the Gulf area due to Hurricane Katrina. Another is the Bay Line Railroad: originally the Atlanta and St. Andrews Bay Railway main line, this railway runs from Panama City through Campbellton. US 231 was constructed parallel to the railroad. The lines have a junction in Cottondale. Other lines within the county were abandoned after restructuring of the railroad industry in the mid to late 20th century. Passenger traffic declined after affordable automobiles became widely available.

Communities

Cities
 Graceville
 Jacob City
 Marianna

Towns

 Alford
 Bascom
 Campbellton
 Cottondale
 Grand Ridge
 Greenwood
 Malone
 Sneads

Unincorporated communities

 Compass Lake, Florida
 Cypress, Florida
 Dellwood, Florida
 Oakdale, Florida
 Round Lake, Florida
 Simsville, Florida
 Sink Creek, Florida
 Two Egg, Florida
 Webbville, Florida

See also
 National Register of Historic Places listings in Jackson County, Florida

References

Further reading
 Daniel R. Weinfeld. The Jackson County War: Reconstruction and Resistance in Post-Civil War Florida (University of Alabama Press; 2012) 224 pages; covers the racial/political violence in the county 1869 to 1871.

External links

Government links/Constitutional offices
 Jackson County Board of County Commissioners
 Jackson County Supervisor of Elections
 Jackson County Property Appraiser
 Jackson County Sheriff's Office
 Jackson County Tax Collector

Special districts
 Jackson District School Board
 Northwest Florida Water Management District

Judicial branch
 Jackson County Clerk of Courts
  Circuit and County Court for the 14th Judicial Circuit of Florida serving Bay, Calhoun, Gulf, Holmes, Jackson and Washington counties

Tourism links
 Jackson County Tourist Development Council

 
Florida counties
1822 establishments in Florida Territory
Populated places established in 1822
North Florida